The Capitol State Forest is a  state forest in Thurston and Grays Harbor counties of the U.S. state of Washington. It includes part of the unusual Mima Mounds geologic feature.

The Capitol State Forest is managed by Washington State Department of Natural Resources. It is a multi-use forest with active logging operations and is open for off-road motorcycles, mountain biking, horseback riding, and hiking.  It is approximately bounded by U.S. Route 12 to the southwest, Interstate 5 to the east and State Route 8 to the north.  It roughly contains the Black Hills.  Topographical Relief -  - 2,659 ft -- 575 Miles of Gravel Road

Cities and towns near its borders include Olympia, Tumwater, Littlerock, Oakville, and McCleary.

References

External links 
 at Washington DNR
Capitol Forest Community Website
mountain biking guide at singletracks.com
Friends of Capitol Forest volunteer organization
Mima Mounds Natural Area Preserve

Washington (state) state forests
Protected areas of Thurston County, Washington
Protected areas of Grays Harbor County, Washington